HMS Tern was a river gunboat built for the Royal Navy by Yarrow in 1927.

Design
Tern and her sister ship  were river gunboats ordered under the Royal Navy 1926 Estimates, and were sometimes referred to as Tern-class river gunboats. The ships were protected by bulletproof plating to the bridges along with gun shields. The four vessels were sometimes grouped in the same class, despite Tern and Seamew having a smaller and shorter design than the latter two vessels.

Service
Tern was constructed by Yarrow in Scotstoun in 1927, with the yard number 1528. After her construction, she was broken down into sections and transported to Hong Kong, where she was reassembled and launched. After her reconstruction she served in the Yangtze.

In 1941, she was transferred back to Hong Kong. In December, she took part in the Battle of Hong Kong. On 11 December, she assisted in the evacuation of British forces from Kowloon to Hong Kong Island. On 12 or 13 December, she shot down a Japanese aircraft. She was scuttled in Deep Water Bay on 19 December, to prevent capture by the Japanese.

References

Ships built in Glasgow
1927 ships
Gunboats of the Royal Navy
Maritime incidents in December 1941